Vardan Pahlevanyan (born 27 February 1988 in Yerevan, Armenian SSR) is an Armenian long jumper. He competed at the 2012 Summer Olympics in the men's long jump.

References

External links
 
 Sports-Reference.com

1988 births
Living people
Sportspeople from Yerevan
Armenian male long jumpers
Olympic athletes of Armenia
Athletes (track and field) at the 2012 Summer Olympics